Damarchilus is a genus of spiders in the family Nemesiidae. It was first described in 2015 by Siliwal, Molur & Raven. , it contains 2 species, both from India.

References

Nemesiidae
Mygalomorphae genera
Spiders of the Indian subcontinent